The Bishop of Derry is an episcopal title which takes its name after the monastic settlement originally founded at Daire Calgach and later known as Daire Colm Cille, Anglicised as Derry. In the Roman Catholic Church it remains a separate title, but in the Church of Ireland it has been united with another bishopric.

History
At the Synod of Ráth Breasail in 1111 Ireland was divided up into ecclesiastical dioceses based on territorial units. One of these was for the Cenel Conaill who could have its Episcopal see either at Raphoe or Derry. At the Synod of Kells in 1152 however Derry and the Inishowen peninsula were moved from the diocese of the Cenel Conaill to that of the Cenel Eogain who controlled both areas. Derry was a Columban establishment founded by Columba who was a prince of the Cenel Conaill. It opposed many of the church reforms as well as being made part of the diocese of the Cenel Eogain. As a compromise the foundation of Derry was essentially made a diocese of its own within that of the Cenel Eogain and its comarb styled as the bishop of Derry.

In regards to the diocese of the Cenel Eogain, its see was at Rathlowry (Maghera), with the diocese in Latin became known as Rathlurensis and its bishop as Episcopis Rathlurensis. In 1246 its bishop, Germanus O'Carolan, obtained sanction from Pope Innocent IV to have the see transferred to Derry due to the remoteness of Rathlowry. By this stage the Columban foundation at Derry had become extinct and was replaced by the Augustinian Order. From 1254 the diocese became known as Derry and the bishop of the Cenel Eogain was styled as the bishop of Derry.

Following the Reformation, there are parallel apostolic successions. In the Church of Ireland, Derry continued a separate see until 1834 when it amalgamated with Raphoe and became the united bishopric of Derry and Raphoe.

In the Roman Catholic Church, the title is still a separate bishopric. On 25 February 2014, Pope Francis appointed the then auxiliary Bishop of Down and Connor – Most Reverend Donal McKeown –  as the new Bishop of Derry. He was installed as Bishop of Derry on Sunday 6 April 2014 in Saint Eugene's Cathedral Derry.

Pre-Reformation bishops
Bishops of the diocese of Cinél nEógain

Pre-Reformation Bishops of Derry

Post-Reformation bishops

Church of Ireland succession

Roman Catholic succession

Notes
 These two Ua Brolcháin bishops were members of the Cenél Feredaig, who were closely associated with Derry.

References

 
Roman Catholic Diocese of Derry
Religion in County Londonderry
Religion in County Tyrone
Lists of Irish bishops and archbishops